The Northern Oregon Coast Range is the northern section of the Oregon Coast Range, in the Pacific Coast Ranges physiographic region, located in the northwest portion of the state of Oregon, United States. Forests in these mountains are considered to be some of the most productive timber land in the world. The Central Oregon Coast Range is directly south of this section with the Southern Oregon Coast Range beyond the central range.

Geology
The origins of these mountains began approximately 40 million years ago during the Eocene age. During this time-period, sandstone and siltstone formed in the area. Additionally, igneous rocks and basalt flows combined with basaltic sandstone to create many of the mountainous formations. Other sedimentary rock in the area formed more recently, around 20 million years ago. It is hypothesized that portions of the northern section of the range were islands during parts of the Eocene era. Other portions of the mountains consist of marine sedimentary rock. The entire coast range sits on a convergent tectonic margin interacting with the Juan de Fuca Plate that is subducting beneath North America tectonic plate. Also, weathering and erosion of the region is a major factor in shaping the landscape. Heavy rainfall and landslides have worked to alter the mountains.

The range is part of a broad, plunging structural arch of sedimentary and Tertiary volcanic strata that is being uplifted. Eocene and Miocene sections form the flanks of the uplifted sections. Some of the oldest rocks are submarine tholeiitic basalts from the Eocene era. The basalt came from the basalt flows that covered much of Oregon and originated from volcanoes in the central portion of the state. Other rocks include sandstone, mudstone, and siltstone. It was during the middle Miocene period that the range was uplifted in the broad, northeast-plunging arch.

Flora and fauna

Portions of the range are in the Siuslaw National Forest and Tillamook State Forest, and large sections of the range were burned in forest fires during the 1930s and 1940s as part of the Tillamook Burn. In the forested areas trees include Sitka spruce, western redcedar, Douglas fir, and western hemlock. Other plants that grow in the region are huckleberry, salmonberry, thimbleberry, salal, vine maple, sword and bracken ferns and Oregon grape to name a few.

Arthropods and molluscs found include collembolans, spiders, beetles, slugs, millipedes and various centipedes. Animals that inhabit the Northern Coast range are weevils, chipmunks, bears, rabbits, white-footed deer mice, Columbian black tail deer and others. Birds include chickadees, red-breasted nuthatches, kinglets, Western pileated woodpeckers, Oregon Canada jays, California creepers, and Sitka red crossbills among others.

Location and climate

Peaks

Other peaks 
 Round Top (Oregon) 
 Neahkahnie Mountain

Rivers

The following rivers have their headwaters in the Northern Oregon Coast Range:

Drains to Columbia River:
Clatskanie River
John Day River
Klaskanine River
Lewis and Clark River
Skipanon River
Wallooskee River
Youngs River
Drains to Willamette River:
Tualatin River
Yamhill River
Drains to Pacific Ocean:
Kilchis River
Miami River
Necanicum River
Nehalem River
Nestucca River
Salmonberry River
Salmon River
Tillamook River
Trask River
Wilson River

References

External links

Mountain ranges of Oregon
Landforms of Clatsop County, Oregon
Landforms of Washington County, Oregon
Landforms of Tillamook County, Oregon
Landforms of Columbia County, Oregon
Landforms of Yamhill County, Oregon